Go Uru (고우루, 高優婁) (?-230) was the prime minister of the ancient Korean kingdom of Goguryeo during the reigns of Kings Sansang and Dongcheon during a period of 24 years.

Background 
Go Uru was a descendant of Goguryeo's founder, King Jumong, and of noble origins. However, the exact line of his ancestry or his family are unknown.

Successor of Eul Pa-So 
After the death of prime minister Eul Paso in the year 203, King Sansang gave the position of Prime Minister to Go Uru. Go Uru remained prime minister for 24 years until his death in 230. Go Uru was succeeded by Wutae Myeongnim Eosu.

See also 
 Three Kingdoms of Korea
 Goguryeo

References

Goguryeo
230 deaths
3rd-century heads of government
Year of birth unknown
Goguryeo people